The 1908 British Isles tour to New Zealand and Australia was the seventh tour by a British Isles team and the fourth to New Zealand and Australia. The tour is often referred to as the Anglo-Welsh Tour as only English and Welsh players were selected due to the Irish and Scottish Rugby Unions not participating. It is retrospectively classed as one of the British Lions tours, as the Lions naming convention was not adopted until 1950.

Led by Arthur 'Boxer' Harding and managed by George Harnett the tour took in 26 matches, 9 in Australia and 17 in New Zealand. Of the 26 games, 23 were against club or invitational teams and three were test matches against the All Blacks. The Lions lost two and drew one match against the All Blacks.

The tour was not received well in Wales, as the Welsh players selected were chosen exclusively from those players from a well-educated and professional-class background. The selection was in fact addressed by the Welsh Rugby Union who stated that when a British Isles team was mooted for a South Africa tour in 1910, that the players should be chosen '...irrespective of the social position of the players.'

Regarding the Lions uniform, 1908 brought a change of format and a change of colours. With the Scottish and Irish unions declining to be involved, red jerseys with a thick white band reflected the combination of England and Wales. Shorts were dark blue with red socks.

Touring party
Manager: George Harnett

Full Backs 
John Dyke (Penarth)
E.J. 'John' Jackett (Falmouth/Leicester)

Three-Quarters
Frederick Ernest Chapman (Westoe)
Reggie Gibbs (Cardiff)
Johnnie Williams (Cardiff)
Rowland Griffiths (Newport)
Jack Jones (Pontypool)
James Phillips Jones (Guy's Hospital)
Pat McEvedy (Guy's Hospital)
Henry Vassall (Blackheath)

Half backs
James "Maffer" Davey (Redruth)
Herbert Laxon (Cambridge University)
William Llewellyn Morgan (Cardiff)
G.L. Williams (Liverpool)

Forwards
Herbert Archer (Guy's Hospital)
Robert Dibble (Bridgwater)
Percy Down (Bristol)
Gerald Kyrke (Marlborough Nomads)
R.K. Green (Neath)
Edgar Morgan (Swansea)
L.S. Thomas (Penarth)
Arthur Harding (Cardiff) (captain)
Jack Williams (London Welsh)
Guy Reginald Hind (Guy's Hospital)
F.S. Jackson (Leicester)
William Leonard Oldham (Coventry)
John Anthony Sydney Ritson (Northern)
Thomas William Smith (Leicester)

Results
Complete list of matches played by the British Isles in New Zealand and Australia:

 Test matches

Test details

First Test

Second Test

Third Test

References

External links 
 
 Geoffrey T. Vincent, '"Practical Imperialism": The Anglo-Welsh Rugby Tour of New Zealand, 1908', The International Journal of the History of Sport, vol. 15, no. 1, April 1998, pp. 123–40 (http://www.tandfonline.com/doi/abs/10.1080/09523369808714015?journalCode=fhsp20#preview).
"Second Test Match" Detailed description of game from newspaper.

1907–08 in British rugby union
1907–08 in English rugby union
1907–08 in Welsh rugby union
1908 in Australian rugby union
1908 rugby union tours
1908 in New Zealand rugby union
1908
1908